Brandon Jennings (born July 15, 1978) is a former American college and professional football player who was a cornerback in the NFL (National Football League). He played four seasons for the Oakland Raiders, Cleveland Browns, Green Bay Packers, and Houston Texans. Jennings was signed as an undrafted free agent by the Oakland Raiders in 2000. He played his collegiate football at Texas A&M.

Professional career
Jennings went undrafted in the 2000 NFL Draft, but was signed by the Oakland Raiders. During his rookie season in 2000 he recorded one tackle. On October 14, 2001, Jennings was waived by the Oakland Raiders. On October 17, 2001, Jennings was claimed off waivers by the Cleveland Browns. On October 24, 2001, Jennings was waived by the Cleveland Browns. On October 29, 2001, the Oakland Raiders signed Jennings to their practice squad. On November 7, 2001, the Oakland Raiders promoted Jennings to their active roster. On November 14, 2001, the Oakland Raiders released Jennings from their active roster and re-signed him to their practice squad two days later. Jennings recorded 12 combined tackles in 2001 and appeared in eight games.

On September 1, 2002, the Oakland Raiders released Jennings as part of their final roster cuts. On October 9, 2002, the Green Bay Packers signed Jennings to their practice squad. On October 15, 2002, the Green Bay Packers released Jennings from their practice squad. On October 24, 2002, the Oakland Raiders signed Jennings to their practice squad. The following day, the Oakland Raiders promoted Jennings from their practice squad to their active roster. On January 12, 2003, the Oakland Raiders waived Jennings. On January 27, 2003, the Houston Texans claimed Jennings off of waivers. On February 27, 2003, the Houston Texans offered Jennings a one-year, $605,000 tender as a restricted free agent. One March 21, 2003, it was reported that Jennings had officially signed his restricted free agent tender with the Houston Texans. On  August 13, 2003, the Houston Texans released Jennings as part of their roster cuts.

References

External links

Profile at NFL.com

1978 births
Living people
All-American college football players
American football cornerbacks
 Cleveland Browns players
 Oakland Raiders players